"Ain't Love the Strangest Thing" is a song by Australian blues and rock band The Black Sorrows. It was released in July 1992 as the first single from their seventh studio album Better Times. It peaked at 46 on the ARIA Charts in September 1992.

Track listing
Australian maxi single (658446 2)
 "Ain't Love the Strangest Thing" – 5:08
 "I Will Follow You Down" – 4:26
 "What Does It Take (To Win Your Love)" (by The Revelators) – 3:53

Weekly charts

References

1992 songs
1992 singles
The Black Sorrows songs
Songs written by Joe Camilleri
Song recordings produced by Joe Camilleri